Rahib Seyidaga oglu Aliyev (born July 12, 1945) is an Azerbaijani stage and film actor, Honored Artist of Azerbaijan (2006).

Biography 
Rahib Aliyev was born on July 12, 1945 in Baku. From an early age, he performed in folk theaters, in the late 1950s he became an actor in theater groups, where he played many roles. From 1965 to 1969, he studied at the Faculty of Acting of Drama-cinema of the Azerbaijan State Theater Institute named after M.A. Aliyev (now Azerbaijan State University of Culture and Arts). During his studies at the institute, in 1967, he was invited to the Azerbaijan State Theatre of Young Spectators named after M. Gorky, where he still works today. Rahib Aliyev officially began his acting career on September 18, 1968. Since 1968, playing on the professional stage, he continues his acting career. Rahib Aliyev played more than 70 roles on the stage of the Theater of Young Spectators.

Awards 
Rahib Aliyev was awarded many diplomas, awards and badges for his creative activity. In 2006, he was awarded the honorary title of "Honored Artist of the Republic of Azerbaijan" for his contribution to the development of theatre art of Azerbaijan. He was also awarded the Presidential Award in 2011, 2013, 2014, 2015, 2016, 2017 and 2018. On March 10, 2015, he was awarded the medal of "Skillful master" established by the Union of Theater Workers of Azerbaijan. On December 10, 2018, he was awarded the "Progress" medal in connection with the 90th anniversary of the Azerbaijan State Theatre of Young Spectators and for his contributions.

Filmography 
The stars do not go out (1971)
I want to understand (1980)
Road story (1980)
The Scoundrel (1988)
Live, golden fish (1988)
The day of the murder (1990)
The Scream (1993)
The dog (1994)
What a beautiful world... (1999)
The truth of a moment (2003)
Execution is delayed!... (2002)
New life (2005)
Inspection (2006)
We will return (2007)
Life of a Javid (2007)
Distinguished (2008)
Man (2010)
Story of court advocates (2011)
The Last Stop (2014)

References

1945 births
Azerbaijani male film actors
Azerbaijan State University of Culture and Arts alumni
Living people
Azerbaijani male stage actors